Žiga Hirschler (21 March 1894, Velika Trnovitica near Bjelovar – 1941 Jasenovac concentration camp) was a Croatian-Jewish composer, music critic and publicist who was killed during the Holocaust.

Life 
Hirschler was born in Zagreb, to a Croatian Jewish family. He completed musical studies in 1917 at the Agram conservatory of the Croatian Music Institute in Zagreb.

Hirschler composed orchestral, piano, vocal and dramatic works, and showed a tendency towards popular music. He was one of the most famous music critics in Zagreb between the two world wars. Hirschler was editor of Musician magazine. With his writing in the Večernji vjesnik and Jutarnji list he closely followed Croatian composers.

As a Jew Hirschler faced persecution by Ustaše and Nazis. During the last days of his life, Hirschler didn't leave his apartment. He just had an intense correspondence with Paula Rendi, waiting for her to give him a pass so that he could cross over to a "free zone". That unfortunately never happened. Hirschler wrote his last letters on 12 September 1941. In one such letter, he dedicated a song to Rendi for her birthday. In late 1941 Hirschler was killed at the Jasenovac concentration camp.

Works

Operas 

 Dvije renesansne noći
 Fiorentinska noć,  1926
 Svadbena noć,  1931
 Mara

Operettas 

 Pobjednica oceana,  1928
 Kaj nam pak moreju,  1935
 Napred naš,  1936
 Iz Zagreba u Zagreb,  1937

His Burlesk has been played on radio by Dan Franklin Smith but not recorded.

References

Bibliography 

 
 
 
 
 Pintar, Marijana, Hirschler, Žiga (Hiršler), u: Macan, Trpimir (ur.), Hrvatski biografski leksikon, Zagreb: Leksikografski zavod Miroslav Krleža, 1983., str. 580–581. (Croatian)
 Polić, Branko, Prekinuti roman Žige Hirschlera, Cantus, 1994, 80/81, str. 25. (Croatian)
 "Torta – Popijevke hrvatskih skladatelja uz klavirsku pratnju" (priredili Kristina Beck – Kukavčić i Felix Spiller; Edicije Spiller – hrvatski skladatelji, Zagreb 2005). (Croatian)
 Vujnović-Tonković, Ankica, Pisana riječ Žige Hirschlera, Novi Omanut – Prilog židovskoj povijesti i kulturi, 1995, 12, str. 5–7. (Croatian)

1894 births
1941 deaths
People from Zagreb
Croatian Jews
Austro-Hungarian Jews
Croatian Austro-Hungarians
Croatian composers
Jewish classical composers
Croatian musicians
Jewish musicians
Croatian civilians killed in World War II
People who died in Jasenovac concentration camp
Croatian people executed in Nazi concentration camps
20th-century classical composers
Male classical composers